Out of Scale is a 1951 American animated short film directed by Jack Hannah and produced by Walt Disney. In the episode, Donald Duck has a ride-on sized train layout in his backyard. There's a large tree (home to Chip 'n Dale) that's out of scale, so Donald moves it while they're out; they come back to see their tree moving. No problem; one of Donald's model houses is just their size.

Plot 
Donald Duck has invented a miniature scale live steam railroad on his backyard property of everything, only to be annoyed by Chip 'n' Dale while planting miniature scale, who are.

However, he also gets rid of Chip and Dale's tree when it's not in the correct miniature scale for his setup. Realizing what's happened, Chip and Dale try to get the tree back from Donald. During the chase/battle, they race past the miniature village and go into a tiny house. While making themselves comfortable inside (which Donald concludes are both a perfect scale), Donald begins to have some fun by impersonating people & simulating extremes of weather but they figure it out, & the chase continues.

In the end, they reclaim their tree which ends up on the railroad track & the train makes a hole though it, & Donald stops the train planning to tear them apart, but they fool him by putting a "Giant Redwood" sign on the front of the tree and take advantage of this to say it is a scale model of California Giant Redwood with a tunnel.

Satisfied with the explanation, Donald thanks Chip and Dale for their appreciation and he rides his train through the tunnel in a joyful way as the chipmunks celebrate their victory.

Voice cast
 Clarence Nash as Donald Duck
 James MacDonald and Dessie Flynn as Chip and Dale

Television
 Disneyland, episode #2.25: "Where Do the Stories Come From?"
 Good Morning, Mickey, episode #3
 The Ink and Paint Club, episode #1.5: "Chip 'N Dale"
 Have a Laugh!, episode #55
 Treasures from the Disney Vault, March 16, 2017

Home media
The short was released on November 11, 2008 on Walt Disney Treasures: The Chronological Donald, Volume Four: 1951-1961.

Additional releases include:
 Walt Disney Cartoon Classics: Chip 'n' Dale (with Donald Duck) (VHS)
 Everybody Loves Donald (VHS)
 Chip 'n' Dale Volume 1: Here Comes Trouble (DVD)
 Everybody Loves Donald (DVD)
 So Dear to My Heart (DVD Disney movie club exclusive)

Notes
 The short's title was later used for an episode of Chip 'n Dale Rescue Rangers.
 The short was inspired by Walt Disney's backyard trainset, the Carolwood Pacific Railroad.
 The cartoon's storyline was the basis for the Golden Book "Donald Duck's Toy Train".
 The main musical theme is an adaptation of I've Been Working on the Railroad.
 Donald Duck's train is actually Casey Jones' train which consists of Engine No. 2 (A 4-4-0 American type steam locomotive), a mail car & a caboose with a #53 from The Brave Engineer.

References

External links 
 
 Out of Scale at The Internet Animation Database
 BCDB

Donald Duck short films
Films produced by Walt Disney
1950s Disney animated short films
Animated films about trains
Films directed by Jack Hannah
1951 animated films
1951 short films
Films scored by Paul Smith (film and television composer)
1950s English-language films
American animated short films
RKO Pictures short films
RKO Pictures animated short films
Films about ducks
Films about rodents
Animated films about mammals
Chip 'n' Dale films